Alaa Baidoun (born 5 March 1983 in Aleppo, Syria) is a Syrian footballer who plays for Al-Muhafaza, which competes in the Syrian Premier League the top division in Syria. He plays as a midfielder. Baidoun scored the winning goal in a friendly match against Tuvalu in 2009.

References

External links
 
 

1983 births
Living people
Sportspeople from Aleppo
Syrian footballers
Syrian expatriate footballers
Expatriate footballers in Lebanon
Expatriate footballers in Yemen
Association football defenders
Syrian expatriate sportspeople in Lebanon
Syrian Premier League players
Akhaa Ahli Aley FC players
Al Mabarra Club players
Lebanese Premier League players